Melhania transvaalensis is a plant in the family Malvaceae, native to South Africa.

Description

Distribution and habitat
Melhania transvaalensis is confined to South Africa's Northern Provinces. Its habitat is stony hills and grassy slopes.

References

transvaalensis
Flora of the Northern Provinces
Plants described in 1888